Dennis Eugene Havig (born May 6, 1949 in Powell, Wyoming) is a former American football guard in the National Football League. He was drafted by the Atlanta Falcons in the eighth round of the 1971 NFL Draft. He played college football at Colorado.

Havig also played for the Houston Oilers and the Green Bay Packers.

External links
Green Bay Packers bio

1949 births
Living people
People from Powell, Wyoming
Players of American football from Wyoming
American football offensive guards
Colorado Buffaloes football players
Atlanta Falcons players
Houston Oilers players
Green Bay Packers players